Stadtoldendorf was a Samtgemeinde ("collective municipality") in the district of Holzminden, in Lower Saxony, Germany. Its seat was in the town Stadtoldendorf. On 1 January 2011, it merged with the former Samtgemeinde Eschershausen to form the new Samtgemeinde Eschershausen-Stadtoldendorf.

The Samtgemeinde Stadtoldendorf consisted of the following municipalities:

 Arholzen 
 Deensen
 Heinade 
 Lenne 
 Stadtoldendorf
 Wangelnstedt

References

Former Samtgemeinden in Lower Saxony